An annular solar eclipse will occur on Thursday, February 16, 2045. A solar eclipse occurs when the Moon passes between Earth and the Sun, thereby totally or partly obscuring the image of the Sun for a viewer on Earth. An annular solar eclipse occurs when the Moon's apparent diameter is smaller than the Sun's, blocking most of the Sun's light and causing the Sun to look like an annulus (ring). An annular eclipse appears as a partial eclipse over a region of the Earth thousands of kilometres wide.

Images 
Animated path

Related eclipses

Solar eclipses of 2044–2047

Saros 131

Tritos series

Metonic series 
 All eclipses in this table occur at the Moon's ascending node.

References

External links 

 http://eclipse.gsfc.nasa.gov/SEplot/SEplot2001/SE2045Feb16A.GIF

2045 2 16
2045 in science
2045 2 16
2045 2 16